Parade is the seventeenth studio album by Japanese pop band Deen. It was released on 9 August 2017 under the Epic Records Japan label.

Background
It was released as "25th debut anniversary's memorial album."

Both of these tracks and coupling song Shounen (from their single Love Forever, 1995) had received renewed album mixes and recordings with subtitles Album version and Parade Style.

The track Kizuna was released as digital single week before album release. Ex. member of Japanese pop band Garnet Crow, Hirohito Furui participated in recording production as an arranger (along with Kimi he no Parade) for first time since 2013.

Their only single which was released in 2016, Kioku no Kage didn't make it in this album, instead it was released in their compilation album DEEN The Best FOREVER Complete Singles++.

Shinji and Kouji in this album performs their own original songs Sensual Blues and Summer boy's tears.

This album was released in three formats: regular CD edition and limited A/B CD+DVD edition. The limited A edition includes BD footage of their live performance Deen Live Joy - Countdown Special- ~Maniac Night~ Vol.3. The limited B edition includes DVD with two music video clips from the album included singles and their making shoots.

Charting
The album reached #22 in its first week and charted for 3 weeks.

Track listing

References

Sony Music albums
Japanese-language albums
2017 albums
Deen (band) albums